is a Japanese light novel series written by FUNA and illustrated by Itsuki Akata. A manga adaptation by Neko Mint began serialization in 2016. Both the light novel and manga have been licensed in North America by Seven Seas Entertainment. An anime television series adaptation by Project No.9 aired from October 7 to December 23, 2019.

Plot
Misato Kurihara, a genius girl who couldn't make any friends due to her exceptional abilities, is killed after being run over while protecting a young girl. Offered the chance to be reborn into a fantasy world, Misato asks that she simply be reincarnated with average abilities. After she regains her memory of her old life, she discovers that "average" in this new world takes into account the power of the absolute strongest and the absolute weakest magical creatures, resulting in her physical and magical abilities being 6,800 times stronger than that of a typical human. The magic used in this world is effected by nanomachines created by a more advanced civilization; the project was eventually abandoned, however, and the world's civilization has regressed and since stagnated as a result.

Reborn as the noble Adele von Ascham, her life takes a sharp turn at the age of eight, when her mother and her grandfather are assassinated by her conniving father, who then marries his mistress and then begins favoring his other daughter. By the age of ten, Adele is sent off to the prestigious Eckland Academy, where she makes the first friends in her two lives. However, when she uses her tremendous magical abilities to save a boy from being beaten by the royal princess' escort and passes herself off as the mortal vessel of a god, the resulting attention towards her person forces her to flee to another kingdom. Attending Hunter's Prep School and forming a team with her classmates Mavis, Reina, and Pauline, Adele tries her best to live her life as normally as possible, which does not prove to be an easy feat.

Characters

The Crimson Vow
 / 

 The central character, Adele is a twelve-year-old girl with long silver hair. She was originally an intelligent Japanese high school girl named , who was unable to make friends due to the expectations placed upon her. After losing her life while saving an elementary school girl from an oncoming truck, she was offered the chance to be reincarnated into a fantasy world, asking only that she would be given "average" abilities so she can live a normal life. After regaining her memories at the age of ten, Adele discovered that her "averaged" abilities actually bestow her with excessive physical strength and powerful magic. After failing to hide her abilities at Eckland Academy, she left her home country and took on the alias of "Mile" to attend Hunter's Prep School, where she forms a party named . She loves books, anime, manga, and video games, the knowledge of which she uses in her new life in very interesting ways, including training her friends to make them more formidable. She has a boob complex, which provokes her anger when someone points it out.Adele's cover name is derived from the term "nautical mile" in Japanese, which has the same kanji as her Japanese first name.

 Also known as Crimson Reina, she is a mage specializing in fire magic. She was born to a traveling merchant, and became a Hunter at an early age, giving her the most practical knowledge and experience amongst the Crimson Vow party members. She has a signature fire spell called Crimson Hellfire, and has a particular hatred for bandits after both her father and a Hunter group who had taken her in were killed by such brigands. Despite being fifteen years old at the start of the series, she is assumed to be a similar age to Mile, the youngest member of their group, due to her petite height and appearance, which is a source of annoyance for her.

 The official leader of the Crimson Vow (although it is always Reina that does the actual "leading"), Mavis is a 17-year-old swordswoman of noble birth. She is tall and has an androgynous appearance, making her popular with other girls, and is a softie for sappy and sad stories, especially the backstories behind each of her friends. After running away from home in the hopes of becoming a knight, she met the other members of the Crimson Vow at the Hunters' Prep School and helped to form the party. When her father later tries to force her back into the role of a demure noble's daughter, Mavis and Mile manage to change the Count's mind (though not his worry) by defeating him and his eldest son in single combat, proving their ability to take care of themselves.

 A 14-year-old mage specializing in healing and water magic, she is the daughter of a merchant and the resident bookkeeper of the Crimson Vow. She usually is shy and mild-mannered, but where her friends and loved ones are concerned, she can manifest a very vicious edge. Pauline became a Hunter to avenge her father, who was killed by thieves employed by the president of the Beckett merchant company, who absorbed her family's shop into his enterprise and forced Pauline's mother into becoming his lover. However, with the help of her friends, Pauline succeeds in exposing the villainy of the Beckett president and his benefactor, Viscount Borderman.

The Wonder Trio

The third daughter of a baron and a friend of Adele's. At first highly jealous of the attention Adele received for her abilities and popularity, she and her friends softened up on her after learning of her tragic family past and sincere personality. Adele eventually trains them in using their magic more effectively, causing the Eckland Academy principal to nickname the three of them (among other titulations) The Wonder Trio. 

 The daughter of a merchant and a friend of Adele's.

 A commoner attending Eckland Academy on scholarship and a friend of Adele's.

Kingdom of Tils
 

The daughter of a family managing the inn where Mile and later the whole of Crimson Vow take up residence. Despite her tender age, she is a very shrewd businessperson and thus the one person effectively running the establishment.

A mage who became obsessed with studying and taming wyverns. After he received Lobreath from a demon, he grew to love the wyvern as a friend, but chose to remain ignorant to the damage a hungry wyvern could cause to a fiefdom's economy.
Clairia
An elven mage and scholar specializing in archaeology. She was part of an expedition which got captured by a group of beastmen working for a trio of dragons who secretly conducted an excavation project on human lands. After being freed by Crimson Vow, she has become interested in Mile because of the latter's absurdly high power levels.

Kingdom of Brandel
 

The third child of the king of Brandel. A direct participant in the incident which forced Adele to reveal her powers in public, she becomes - with some encouragement by her father, who is seeking the supposed "goddess'" favor - interested in Adele after learning of her familial circumstances.
The von Ascham Family

As described above, Adele's father had married into the von Ascham family and then orchestrated the assassination of his wife, Viscountess von Ascham, and her father, the former family patriarch, to claim their family's wealth and prestige. After shunning his daughter, Adele, to a boarding school, he intended to raise his daughter by his mistress, Prissy, as his only heir. However, when the avatar incident prompts the king to invite Adele to the royal palace, Adele instead deflects the invitation towards Prissy before fleeing the kingdom to escape the unwanted publicity. As a result of this, and the testimony of the late Viscountess' personal friends, the treacherous Viscount and his new family are found out and imprisoned.

Others

A young man who Misato met after her death, who claims to have a role similar to "God". As thanks to Misato for saving a girl he had chosen to be mankind's future savior, he grants her a reincarnation into a fantasy world with average abilities, as requested. However, since he measured the term "average" using the new world's most powerful creature - an ancient dragon - as a template, Misato's reincarnation has been granted powers far beyond what she actually wanted.
 

A mysterious creature that only communicates with Adele. It watches over the nanomachines that make up people's magic in the other world. In the manga, it appears as a tiny, sphere-bodied robot, while in the anime it looks like a young cat. Nano's character is a personification of the nanomachines featured in the novel series, where their manifestations are far more impersonal.
 

 Misato's younger sister. Although she loves her family, she is not a hardcore otaku like the rest of them.

Media

Web novel
FUNA began serializing the story as a web novel on the user-generated novel publishing website Shōsetsuka ni Narō on January 14, 2016. , 492 chapters of the web novel have been published.

Light novels
The series was acquired for print publication by Earth Star Entertainment, who published the first light novel, with illustrations by Itsuki Akata, in May 2016 under their Earth Star Novel imprint. Seven Seas Entertainment announced on September 11, 2017 that they had licensed the series. Additionally, a spin-off light novel titled "Lily's Miracle" was written by Kousuke Akai and released on December 14, 2019 (English: November 9, 2021).

Manga
A manga adaptation with art by Neko Mint began serialization online on Earth Star Entertainment's Comic Earth Star website on August 5, 2016. Seven Seas announced on September 11, 2017 that they had licensed the manga. A spin-off manga titled Didn't I Say to Make My Abilities Average in the Next Life?! Everyday Misadventures! began serialization in Comic Earth Star in July 2019. In April 2020, Seven Seas Entertainment announced their license to the spin-off manga.

Anime
An anime adaptation was announced via Twitter on February 26, 2018. The anime, later confirmed to be a television series, is directed by Masahiko Ohta, written by Takashi Aoshima, and animated by Project No.9, with Sō Watanabe as character designer and Yasuhiro Misawa as music composer. The series aired from October 7 to December 23, 2019 on AT-X, Tokyo MX, BS11, TVA, and ABC. Azumi Waki, Sora Tokui, Fumiko Uchimura, and Masumi Tazawa performed the series' opening theme song "Smile Skill=Sukisukiskill", while Waki performed the series' ending theme song "Genzai ↑ Banzai ↑". The series is streamed by Crunchyroll worldwide outside of Asia. The anime covers the first four volumes of the novel series.

See also
 I Shall Survive Using Potions!, another light novel series by FUNA
 Saving 80,000 Gold in Another World for My Retirement, another light novel series by FUNA

Notes

References

External links
  at Shōsetsuka ni Narō 
  
 Spin-off 4-koma manga by Yūki Moritaka 
  
 

2019 anime television series debuts
2016 Japanese novels
Anime and manga based on light novels
Comedy anime and manga
Crunchyroll anime
Earth Star Entertainment manga
Fiction about reincarnation
Isekai anime and manga
Isekai novels and light novels
Japanese webcomics
Light novels
Light novels first published online
Project No.9
Seven Seas Entertainment titles
Shōnen manga
Shōsetsuka ni Narō
Webcomics in print